Blackwood is a south eastern suburb located in the foothills of Adelaide, South Australia. It is part of the local government area of the City of Mitcham.

History
The name "Blackwood" most likely comes from either the Acacia melanoxylon, also known as the Australian blackwood, which grows in the nearby Mount Lofty Ranges, or the Eucalyptus odorata, which grows in Blackwood and has dark bark.

The earliest reference to Blackwood was a mention of Blackwood Vale Farm in 1847, though this is in present-day Glenalta. One of the earliest places named for Blackwood was the Blackwood Inn, which opened in 1869. In 1880 it changed names to the Belair Hotel. Belair Post Office opened on 3 April 1859 and was renamed Blackwood in 1881, when the Belair office was moved some distance away. The first land grants in the area had been made in 1840, and various churches were established throughout the 19th century, but most development in Blackwood didn't take place until the Adelaide to Aldgate section of the Adelaide-Wolseley railway line was opened, with Blackwood railway station opening in 1883. Land was subdivided for housing at about the same time and the railway line was later connected all the way to Melbourne.

Places of interest
Blackwood Soldiers' Memorial was erected in 1921 in the most prominent place in Blackwood: the five-ways roundabout. It is a place of Local Heritage, listed for being "a notable landmark in the area".

Wittunga Botanic Garden, originally a private property with English gardens established in 1901, is located in Blackwood and features displays of Australian and South African plants.

Blackwood High School and Blackwood Primary School are located nearby in Eden Hills.

St Peters Lutheran School is also located on Cumming Street, opposite to the Blackwood Football Club oval, bordering the suburb of Craigburn Farm. There is diverse fauna in the park that wanders into Craigburn Farm including kangaroos, koalas, and echidnas. Many waterfalls, creeks and gullies are also scattered and found throughout the area.

Uniting (former Methodist), Anglican, Church of Christ, Baptist, Roman Catholic and Lutheran churches are located in Blackwood, as well as Pentecostal churches including the Hills Christian Family Centre and Frontier Christian centre.

Since the late nineteenth century, Main Road, Blackwood and surrounding areas have formed a vibrant and diverse food and retail centre.

Transport
Blackwood railway station is a transport hub with buses to Adelaide and the outer Southern suburbs, and trains to Adelaide and Belair.

Media
The Blackwood area was home to the Coromandel (4 August 1945 – 13 August 1970) and its successor, the Coromandel Times (20 August 1970 – 18 March 1976), published weekly by the Blackwood Progress Association. On 22 January 1970, it changed from a Saturday to a Thursday paper.

It is also home to a regional publication, The Blackwood Times. The publication, first issued in December 1994, describes itself as "a tabloid size, monthly newspaper, delivered free of charge to over 13,000 households and businesses in Belair, Bellevue Heights, Blackwood, Eden Hills, Coromandel Valley, Glenalta, Hawthorndene, Blackwood Park, Upper Sturt, Aberfoyle Park and Flagstaff Hill." Besides local news and events, it also contains information related to the activities of Mitcham Council.

Residents
The suburbs of Blackwood, Glenalta and Craigburn Farm had a combined population of 6,379 in 2,596 households in 2001. Norman Tindale, an anthropologist, archaeologist and entomologist, lived in his Blackwood residence "Kurlge" from 1955 to 1969. The hip hop group the Hilltop Hoods and country singer Beccy Cole (whose song Blackwood Hill references the suburb) are from the area. Award-winning screen composer and filmmaker Milton Trott grew up in Blackwood. Independent Hip-Hop artist Allday also grew up in Blackwood.

Politics
Blackwood is in the state electorate of Waite, represented in the South Australian House of Assembly by Labor MP Catherine Hutchesson, and the federal electorate of Boothby, represented in the Australian House of Representatives by Labor MP Louise Miller-Frost. Blackwood has a relatively high vote for the Greens when compared to the rest of its electorate and state,

Notes

External links

City of Mitcham
Blackwood High School
All Hallows' Anglican Church
Blackwood Hills Baptist

Suburbs of Adelaide